"Sweet Dream" is a song recorded by the English progressive rock band Jethro Tull on 31 August 1969, at Morgan Studios, London. It was their second straight UK Top Ten single, reaching number 7 in the UK Singles Chart. The b-side was a non-album track, "17", recorded on 11 September 1969, also at Morgan. It later appeared as a bonus track on remastered versions of Stand Up. "Sweet Dream" has appeared on many Tull compilation albums, while "17" has been rarely seen. In the UK, the single was the first release on Chrysalis Records.

The song was included on the 1972 Warner/Reprise sampler album, The Whole Burbank Catalog. This was the first US release.

Composition
The song is in the key of E minor.

Music video
In 1981, a music video was made for the Slipstream tour. Ian Anderson is dressed up like a vampire and it shows clips from old horror films.

Charts
The song made number 7 in the UK.

Personnel
Jethro Tull
 Ian Anderson – flute, 12-string guitar, lead vocals
 Glenn Cornick – bass guitar
 Martin Barre – electric guitar
 Clive Bunker – drums, percussion

Additional musician
 David Palmer - arranger and orchestra conductor

References

Jethro Tull (band) songs
1969 songs
Chrysalis Records singles
Island Records singles
Reprise Records singles
Fontana Records singles
Songs written by Ian Anderson
Song recordings produced by Ian Anderson